The 1st PGA Golden Laurel Awards, honoring the best film producers of 1989, were held at the Beverly Wilshire Hotel in Los Angeles, California on March 28, 1990. The awards were presented by Ronald Reagan.

Winners and nominees

Film

Special

References

 1989
1989 film awards
1989 television awards